The 2010–11 Swedish Figure Skating Championships were held at the Isstadion in Malmö between December 16 and 19, 2010. Skaters competed in the disciplines of men's singles, ladies' singles, and pair skating] on the senior and junior levels, as well as two age-group levels of novice: Riksmästerskap (RM) and UngdomsSM (USM). The results were among the criteria used to choose the teams to the 2011 World Championships and 2011 European Championships.

Senior results

Men

Ladies

Pairs

External links
  
 2010–11 Swedish Championships results

Swedish Figure Skating Championships 2010-2011
Swedish Figure Skating Championships 2010-2011
Swedish Figure Skating Championships
Figure Skating Championships 2010-2011
Figure Skating Championships 2010-2011
Sports competitions in Malmö
2010s in Malmö